Lula Vashti Turley Murphy (February 1884 – March 17, 1960) was an American educator and community leader, one of the founding members of Delta Sigma Theta, the historically black sorority.

Early life and education 

Lula Vashti Turley was born in 1884, in Washington, D.C., the daughter of Hamilcar Turley and Ida H. Francis Turley. Her father was a clerk in the Pension Bureau, and a church choirmaster. Both of her parents died when she was a girl, and her older siblings both died while she was in high school. 

Turley graduated from the M Street School in Washington, D.C., and trained as a teacher at the Miner Normal School (now the University of the District of Columbia). In 1913, while she was a student at Howard University, Turley was one of the founders of Delta Sigma Theta. At Howard, she graduated in the class of 1914.

Delta Sigma Theta and other activities 
Vashti Turley Murphy taught school as a young woman, and traveled. She was founder of the Baltimore alumnae chapter of Delta Sigma Theta. In 1932 she and Vivian Johnson Cook co-founded the Philomathian Club, a black women's study group. In the 1950s, she encouraged all Delta alumnae to vote, and to join the NAACP. In 1957, she was honored as Mother of the Year by the Baltimore alumnae chapter of Delta Sigma Theta.

Murphy was a member of the board of directors of the Baltimore YWCA, president of the St. James Episcopal Church Women's Auxiliary, a member of the wives' club of Alpha Phi Alpha (her husband's fraternity), and active at Morgan State College (where her husband was on the Board of Trustees). She was the first president of the Women's Auxiliary of Crownsville State Hospital. She was also president of the Parent Teacher Association at Public School No. 103 in Baltimore.

Personal life and legacy 
In 1916, Vashti Turley married her Howard University German instructor Carl J. Murphy. He was later best known as a newspaper publisher. They had five daughters: Martha Elizabeth (1917–1998), Ida Ann (1918-1996), Carlita (1921 - 2006)  and Vashti (1921 - 1981)  (twins born 1921), and Frances (1922–2007). Her eldest daughter Elizabeth Murphy Moss was a journalist, war correspondent, columnist, and editor. Her granddaughter and namesake Vashti Murphy McKenzie is a bishop in the African Methodist Episcopal Church. 

Vashti Turley Murphy died in 1960, aged 76 years, in Baltimore, after a long illness and a leg amputation. Thurgood Marshall was one of the many honorary pallbearers at her funeral. The Baltimore chapter of Delta Sigma Theta created a Vashti Turley Murphy Award for meritorious service, and a scholarship fund in her name. The community center at the Crownsville State Hospital was named for Vashti Murphy.

References

External links 
 Toya G. Corbett, "Family, Faith And Feminism: The Murphy Women, 1896-2000" (PhD dissertation, Morgan State University 2014). A doctoral dissertation about Vashti Turley Murphy, her inlaws, her children, and her grandchildren.
Sean Yoes, "The Murphy Women: Matriarchs of a Media Dynasty" AFRO (March 19, 2020).

1884 births
1960 deaths
Howard University alumni
African-American educators
Delta Sigma Theta founders
Murphy family